André Cerbonney (10 April 1900 – 4 April 1992) was a French sprinter. He competed in the men's 100 metres at the 1928 Summer Olympics.

References

External links
 

1900 births
1992 deaths
Athletes (track and field) at the 1928 Summer Olympics
French male sprinters
Olympic athletes of France
Place of birth missing